Mermaid's Pool is a small pool on Kinder Scout in Derbyshire, England, which, according to legend, is inhabited by a beautiful mermaid who can be seen if you look into the water at sunrise on Easter Sunday. It is also said that its water is salty due to its being connected by an underground passage to the Atlantic. A contributor to the magazine The Reliquary, Henry Kirke, wrote a poem about a young man who drowned in the pool after he had fallen in love with her.

Another version describes her rather as a nymph who lives on Kinder Scout, and who bathes in the pool daily. This version describes how a local man to whom she took a liking was led by her to a nearby cavern, and whom she made immortal. This promise of immortality is said to apply to anyone who sees the mermaid on Easter Eve.

References 

Peak District